Herbert Heywood (February 1, 1881 – September 15, 1964) was an American film actor. He appeared in more than 120 films between 1915 and 1950.

Selected filmography

 The Call of the Sea (1915) - The Doctor
 Marie Galante (1934) - Tour Guide (uncredited)
 Gentlemen Are Born (1934) - Elderly Man (uncredited)
 Music in the Air (1934) - Fire Captain (uncredited)
 Life Begins at 40 (1935) - Rural Character (uncredited)
 Black Fury (1935) - Charlie - the Bartender (uncredited)
 Eight Bells (1935) - Engineer (uncredited)
 Go Into Your Dance (1935) - Dick (uncredited)
 Ladies Crave Excitement (1935) - Constable (uncredited)
 The Irish in Us (1935) - Joe's Steak House Owner (uncredited)
 Tailspin Tommy in the Great Air Mystery (1935, Serial) - Manuel Casmetto
 A Feather in Her Hat (1935) - Fish Monger (uncredited)
 Moonlight on the Prairie (1935) - Pop Powell
 Escape from Devil's Island (1935) - Bouillon
 Man Hunt (1936) - Charlie (uncredited)
 It Had to Happen (1936) - Trainer (uncredited)
 The Story of Louis Pasteur (1936) - Boncourt (uncredited)
 Road Gang (1936) - Convict at Blackfoot (uncredited)
 King of the Pecos (1936) - Josh Billings
 Robin Hood of El Dorado (1936) - Hacendado Wanting to Fight (uncredited)
 The King Steps Out (1936) - Innkeeper (uncredited)
 Sins of Man (1936) - Stage Door Man (uncredited)
 The Arizona Raiders (1936) - First Sheriff at Hanging (uncredited)
 White Fang (1936) - Mac (uncredited)
 A Son Comes Home (1936) - Hawkins (uncredited)
 Valiant Is the Word for Carrie (1936) - Chairman of Council (uncredited)
 You Only Live Once (1937) - Brakeman in Diner (uncredited)
 I Promise to Pay (1937) - Watchman (uncredited)
 Mountain Justice (1937) - Jury Foreman at Jeff's Trial (uncredited)
 Criminals of the Air (1937) - Hot-Cake Joe (uncredited)
 Draegerman Courage (1937) - Steve
 The Go Getter (1937) - Speedboat Operator (uncredited)
 San Quentin (1937) - Pop (uncredited)
 Slave Ship (1937) - Old Man
 Slim (1937) - Timekeeper (uncredited)
 White Bondage (1937) - Zack Walters (uncredited)
 Confession (1937) - Porter Carrying Letter (uncredited)
 Over the Goal (1937) - Jailkeeper (uncredited)
 Wells Fargo (1937) - Bartender (uncredited)
 Crime School (1938) - Boiler Room Supervisor (uncredited)
 Blockade (1938) - Bridge Sentry (uncredited)
 Three Blind Mice (1938) - Workman
 Racket Busters (1938) - Gas Station Owner (uncredited)
 Sing You Sinners (1938) - Al Burkee (uncredited)
 Swing, Sister, Swing (1938) - Mr. Beagle
 King of the Underworld (1939) - Clem (uncredited)
 The Oklahoma Kid (1939) - Deputy (uncredited)
 The Spirit of Culver (1939) - Watchman (uncredited)
 Let Us Live (1939) - Theatre Watchman (uncredited)
 The Return of the Cisco Kid (1939) - General Store Proprietor (uncredited)
 Young Mr. Lincoln (1939) - Tug-o'-War Contest Official (uncredited)
 Susannah of the Mounties (1939) - Hostler (uncredited)
 Konga, the Wild Stallion (1939) - Sheriff (uncredited)
 The Roaring Twenties (1939) - Pop (uncredited)
 Legion of the Lawless (1940) - Doctor Denton
 The Grapes of Wrath (1940) - Gas Station Attendant (uncredited)
 Little Old New York (1940) - Horace
 King of the Lumberjacks (1940) - Laramie, Train Engineer
 Brigham Young (1940) - Jokester at Chronicle Notice (uncredited)
 Young People (1940) - Farmer at Town Meeting (uncredited)
 No Time for Comedy (1940) - Joe (uncredited)
 Yesterday's Heroes (1940) - Conductor (uncredited)
 Spring Parade (1940) - Sepp - Wagon Driver (uncredited)
 A Dispatch from Reuter's (1940) - News Vendor in Paris (uncredited)
 The Strawberry Blonde (1941) - Toby
 The Lady from Cheyenne (1941) - Bit Role (uncredited)
 The Great American Broadcast (1941) - Doorman (uncredited)
 Out of the Fog (1941) - Morgue Attendant (uncredited)
 Sergeant York (1941) - Man at Church (uncredited)
 Bad Men of Missouri (1941) - Willard (uncredited)
 Manpower (1941) - Charlie - Watchman (uncredited)
 One Foot in Heaven (1941) - Shopkeeper (uncredited)
 Blues in the Night (1941) - Train Brakeman
 They Died with Their Boots On (1941) - Newsman (uncredited)
 Wild Bill Hickok Rides (1942) - Man at Citizen's Meeting (uncredited)
 Kings Row (1942) - Arnold Kelly (uncredited)
 Always in My Heart (1942) - Fisherman with Boat (uncredited)
 I Was Framed (1942) - Man on Park Bench (uncredited)
 In This Our Life (1942) - Worker (uncredited)
 Almost Married (1942) - Perkins
 Yankee Doodle Dandy (1942) - Colony Opera House Doorman (uncredited)
 The Big Shot (1942) - Gas Station Attendant (uncredited)
 Gentleman Jim (1942) - Man on Telephone (uncredited)
 Honeymoon Lodge (1943) - Conductor (uncredited)
 Fired Wife (1943) - Watchman (uncredited)
 Top Man (1943) - Mover (uncredited)
 Swingtime Johnny (1943) - Pop
 The Merry Monahans (1944) - Doorman (uncredited)
 None but the Lonely Heart (1944) - Dad Fitchitt (uncredited)
 The Mummy's Curse (1944) - Hill - Foreman (uncredited)
 Can't Help Singing (1944) - Mr. Brown (uncredited)
 Main Street After Dark (1945) - Hotel Clerk (uncredited)
 That's the Spirit (1945) - Doorman (uncredited)
 Along Came Jones (1945) - Townsman (uncredited)
 Her Highness and the Bellboy (1945) - Mr. Dwerger - Shop Owner (uncredited)
 This Love of Ours (1945) - Gardener (uncredited)
 Snafu (1945) - Fred (uncredited)
 Scarlet Street (1945) - Bellboy (uncredited)
 Idea Girl (1946) - Grumpy Man (uncredited)
 Smoky (1946) - Livery Stable Proprietor (uncredited)
 It's a Wonderful Life (1946) - Building & Loan Depositor (uncredited)
 The Egg and I (1947) - Mailman (uncredited)
 The Vigilantes Return (1947) - Farmer (uncredited)
 Brute Force (1947) - Chef (uncredited)
 They Won't Believe Me (1947) - Sheriff (uncredited)
 I Wonder Who's Kissing Her Now (1947) - Doorman (uncredited)
 This Time for Keeps (1947) - Riley (uncredited)
 The Wreck of the Hesperus (1948) - Alexander Tarn
 Panhandle (1948) - Neill (uncredited)
 Scudda Hoo! Scudda Hay! (1948) - Dugan (uncredited)
 All My Sons (1948) - McGraw (uncredited)
 Green Grass of Wyoming (1948) - Storekeeper Mort Johnson
 Feudin', Fussin' and A-Fightin' (1948) - Judge (uncredited)
 The Walls of Jericho (1948) - Tough (uncredited)
 Belle Starr's Daughter (1948) - Lounger (uncredited)
 Family Honeymoon (1948) - Station Agent (uncredited)
 That Wonderful Urge (1948) - Marriage License Clerk (uncredited)
 El Paso (1949) - Mahoney - the Lawyer (uncredited)
 The Beautiful Blonde from Bashful Bend (1949) - Waiter (uncredited)
 Take One False Step (1949) - Attendant (uncredited)
 Arctic Manhunt (1949) - Mailman (uncredited)
 Malaya (1949) - Bartender (uncredited)
 The Inspector General (1949) - Goatherd (uncredited)
 A Ticket to Tomahawk (1950) - Old-timer (uncredited)
 The Petty Girl (1950) - Royal Roof Doorman (uncredited)
 The Return of Jesse James (1950) - Frank James' Neighbor (uncredited)

References

External links

1881 births
1964 deaths
20th-century American male actors
American male film actors
Male actors from Chicago